Claude L'Engle (October 19, 1868 – November 6, 1919) was a United States representative from Florida for one term from 1913 to 1915.

Early life
He was born in Jacksonville, Florida, where he attended the public schools and Duval High School (Jacksonville). He engaged in mercantile pursuits and later became the editor and publisher of Dixie, a weekly newspaper.

Congress
L'Engle was elected as a Democrat to the Sixty-third Congress (March 4, 1913 – March 3, 1915) but was an unsuccessful candidate for renomination in 1914 to the Sixty-fourth Congress. After leaving Congress, he again engaged in journalism.

Death
He died in Jacksonville, Florida in 1919 and was buried in Evergreen Cemetery.

References
 The Sun newspaper, edited by Claude L'Engle from the Florida Digital Newspaper Library

1868 births
1919 deaths
Democratic Party members of the United States House of Representatives from Florida
Politicians from Jacksonville, Florida
20th-century American politicians